Events from the year 1685 in Denmark.

Incumbents
 Monarch – Christian V
 Grand Chancellor – Frederik Ahlefeldt

Events
 16 April  Fort Frederiksborg is sold to the English.
 10 May  Leonora Christina Ulfeldt is released after twent-one years in confinement in Blåtårn.
 3 October  The County of Reventlow is established by Conrad von Reventlow from the manors of Sandbjerg and Ballegård as well asthe farm Bøgskov.

Undated
 The Brandenburg Colony is established on St. Thomas in the Danish West Indies.
 Encouraged by his queen, Christian V licensed the formation of a reformed congregation among German, Dutch and French immigrants.

Births
 28 October  Hans Gram, historian (died 1748)

Full date missing
 Povl Badstuber, coppersmith and industrialist (died 1762)

Deaths
 29 January  Ove Ramel, landowner (born 1637)
 20 February  Queen Sophie Amalie, Queen of Denmark (born 1628)
 10 June  Peder Lauridsen Scavenius, jurist, civil servant, rector and landowner (born 1723)
 23 August  Ludvig Rosenkrantz, nobleman (born 1628)

Publications
 Peder Syv': Den Danske Sprog-Kunst ("The Danish Language-Art")
 Peder Hansen Resen: Petri Johannis Resenii Bibliotheca Regiæ Academiæ Hafniensi Donata Cui Præfixa Est Ejusdem Resenii Vita

References

 
Denmark
Years of the 17th century in Denmark